Taran Kaur Dhillon (born 29 July 1979), known by her stage name Hard Kaur, is an Indian rapper and hip hop singer; as well as playback singer and actress in the Bollywood industry.

Early life
Hard Kaur was born in Kanpur, Uttar Pradesh, India on 29 July 1979 as Taran Kaur Dhillon into a Punjabi Jatt Sikh family of the Dhillon clan. She was raised in Kanpur, where her mother ran a small beauty parlour in the house. When she was young, her father was killed and her mother’s beauty parlour was burnt down by anti-Sikh rioters. Her paternal grandparents asked her mother to leave their house and wanted to keep her brother with them. Subsequently she, her brother and her mother moved to Hoshiarpur, Punjab, India to her maternal grandparents house, where they stayed for the next couple of years.

In 1991, her mother remarried a British citizen and her family moved to Birmingham, England, where her mother started working and studying to eventually open a beauty salon, in Smethwick. Meanwhile, Hard Kaur did her schooling as an Indian immigrant in the UK. After developing interest in hip-hop she started her music career as a rapper.

Career
She recorded the song "Ek Glassy" and was top for the UK then in 2007 rapped for Sriram Raghavan's movie Johnny Gaddaar'''s song "Paisa Phek (Move Your Body)." Since then she has sung in movies like Ugly Aur Pagli ("Talli"), Singh Is Kinng, Kismat Konnection, Bachna Ae Haseeno, Ram Gopal Varma Ki Aag, Ajab Prem Ki Ghazab Kahani, and Prince.

Kaur performed at Live Earth India, 2008.

Her first solo album Supawoman was released in 2007.BBC Review: "Britain's premier female Asian rapper finally releases her debut album..." BBC, 17 January 2008.

In 2008, Hard Kaur was nominated for two awards at the UK Asian Music Awards: "Best Urban Act" and "Best Female Act". She won "Best Female Act".

In October 2012, Hard Kaur released her second music album titled Party Loud All Year: P.L.A.Y. The album, produced in collaboration with Sony music, featured ten songs, all of which were written and composed by her. The most successful song of the album was Mujhe Peeney do.

In 2013, she collaborated with composer Ram Sampath and Rajasthani folk singer Bhanvari Devi for Coke Studio India. In the song Katey or Kathe – Bhanvari Devi's part is a Rajasthani folk song which is dedicated to Lord Krishna (Saanwariyo) and Rap by Hard Kaur – written by herself in which she express her personal life journey. At the time of elections, she composed a song "Karle Tu Voting" to spread awareness about voting. Hard Kaur composed a song for FIFA World Cup named "Goal Mar Goal Mar". The song aptly describes fan frenzy and is sung in Hindi, Punjabi, Bengali & South language (?) too. She has also written the lyrics for the song.

Controversial Comments

Hard Kaur is originally from Kanpur, Uttar Pradesh, India; where she was born and raised and currently lives in the UK, in Birmingham, England as an Indian national and citizen and has expressed her support for the Sikh-separatist Khalistan movement on multiple occasions in videos, while criticizing the current Indian Prime Minister Narendra Modi, the current Indian Home Minister Amit Shah, their supporters and followers, the Indian government, Hindu nationalists, the BJP party and the RSS. Alt URL Alt URL Alt URL

In June 2019, a First Information Report was lodged against her for comments about Yogi Adityanath and Mohan Bhagwat. In August 2019, her Twitter account was suspended after she posted a video abusing Amit Shah and Narendra Modi with Khalistan Supporters.

Kaur released a song and music video in 2019 after the abrogation of Article 370 of the Constitution of India by the Government of India which revoked the special status of the Jammu and Kashmir state of India; supporting Kashmiri-Separatism in India, in which she called herself a 'proud Khalistani'.

Kaur released an IG video in 2020 calling Indian people "naked, hungry, dirty, idiots, illiterate, uneducated mother****ers".

In a now deleted video that Kaur uploaded on Instagram and Twitter, she slut-shamed Bollywood actresses, accusing them of 'sleeping their way to the top' and mocking the Indian #MeToo movement victims who spoke out against their perpetrators, who were mostly Film-directors, producers and senior actors by insinuating that they're lying and they asked for it and that they knew very-well about Bollywood's casting couch in advance.

Discography
EPs
 Voodoo Hill (1997)

Albums
 Supawoman (2007)
 Party Loud All Year: P.L.A.Y (2012)

Compilation appearances
 Ajab Prem Ki Ghazab Kahani (soundtrack, 2009)
 The Rising - Volume 1''  (mixtape, 2017)

Filmography

Television acts

See also 

 List of British Sikhs

References

External links

 Hard Kaur All Songs Download At DJMobmix
 Hard-Kaur video interview
 More about Hard Kaur at Singh is King.co.uk
 Official MySpace Page
 Interview with Hard Kaur at Besharam.co.uk
 Fighting it out: Hard Kaur at Fried Eye

Living people
Indian rappers
Indian women
Indian women rappers
Punjabi people
Punjabi women
Indian Sikhs
People from Kanpur
Rappers from Birmingham, West Midlands
1979 births
Indian emigrants to England
Bollywood playback singers
English women rappers
Women musicians from Uttar Pradesh
English Sikhs
Musicians from Birmingham, West Midlands